When the Last Morning Glory Blooms is an album by American musician Peter Ostroushko, released in 2010.

History
A collection of nine waltzes and one ballad, many of the songs were written by Ostroushko for family and friends that he didn't expect to record. The title song was one he had written and played once on A Prairie Home Companion, and never played again.

Reception 

In his Allmusic review, music critic Jeff Tamarkin wrote
There's a quiet elegance and an undeniable timelessness embedded in the ten songs that comprise When the Last Morning Glory Blooms, as if Peter Ostroushko didn't so much write them as discover them, lying around undisturbed for a hundred years, on yellowed sheet music atop a forgotten parlor piano in some dusty attic... Ostroushko avoids flourish and the ostentatious; his technique on both mandolin and fiddle is the definition of virtuosity, but that's never what it's about for him. Ostroushko's purpose in brandishing an instrument isn't to dazzle with flash and style but to communicate as directly as possible, both with his fellow players and his listeners, and he accomplishes that easily here... Ostroushko displays, not for the first time and surely not for the last, why the praises never stop coming his way.

Track listing 
All songs by Peter Ostroushko unless otherwise noted.
"Maycomb, Alabama 1936" – 4:52
"When the Last Morning Glory Blooms" – 5:26
"The B and B Waltz" – 3:57
"Napoleon Crossing the Alps" (Traditional) – 4:01
"The Nine Years Waltz" (Norman Blake) – 3:33
"Down Where the River Bends" – 5:50
"Marjorie's Waltz #4" – 3:48
"The A and A Waltz" – 4:31
"Waltz for Sedra" – 2:37
"Memories of Tyler, Texas" – 3:26

Personnel
Peter Ostroushko – mandolin, fiddle
Diane Tremaine – cello
Sedra Bistodeau – fiddle
Nancy Blake – cello ("The Nine Years Waltz")
Norman Blake – guitar ("The Nine Years Waltz")
Joel Sayles – bass
Dan Chouinard – accordion, piano
Pat Donohue – guitar, slide guitar
Richard Dworsky – piano
Dick Gimble – guitar
Johnny Gimble – fiddle
Beatrice Blanc – violin
Michael Sutton – violin
Sabina Thatcher – viola
Sarah Lewis – cello
Production notes:
Peter Ostroushko – producer, mixing, arranger
Executive producer – Eric Peltoniemi
David Hammonds – engineer
David Middlebrook	Engineer
Matthew Zimmerman – engineer, mastering, mixing
Anna Kim Ostroushko – photography
Daniel Corrigan – photography
Jon Reischl – cover art

References

2010 albums
Peter Ostroushko albums
Red House Records albums